Sudhakar is an Indian name and may refer to:

 Sudhakar (actor) (born 1959), Indian actor
 Patel Sudhakar Reddy (died 2009), member of the central committee of the Communist Party of India
 Sudhakar Chaturvedi (born 1897), Vedic scholar in Bangalore in Karnataka, India
 Sudhakar Krishnamurti (born 1957), medical doctor
 Sudhakar Rao (born 1952), former Indian cricketer
 Suravaram Sudhakar Reddy (born 1942), member of the 12th and 14th Lok Sabha of India, represents the Nalgonda constituency
 R Sudhakar (born 1959), Judge of the Indian Judiciary
 K. Sudhakar, designer and owner of Sudha Cars Museum

Other uses
 Sudhakar, a 20th-century Bengali weekly magazine.

References